Chance Encounter is a studio album by Ramsey Lewis, released in 1982 on Columbia Records. The album reached No. 16 on the Billboard Top Jazz Albums chart.

Track listing

Charts

References

1982 albums
Ramsey Lewis albums
Columbia Records albums